Charles Gifford may refer to:
Charles Gifford (astronomer) (1861–1948), New Zealand explorer and astronomer
Charles Gifford (Canadian politician) (1821–1896), member of the Ontario provincial legislature
Charles K. Gifford (born 1942), corporate director of CBS
Charles L. Gifford (1871–1947), American congressman from Massachusetts
Charles Alling Gifford (1860–1937), architect in the United States
Charles L. C. Gifford (1825–1877), American attorney and politician in New Jersey